OKFOL is an explosive, used in a variety of applications. It is particularly suitable for use in shaped charges. It normally consists of 95% HMX phlegmatized with 5% wax. It has a density of 1.777 grams per cubic centimetre, explosive velocity of 8,670 metres per second and a TNT equivalent of 1.70.

See also
 Octol, another HMX-based explosive.

Explosives